Homotherium, also known as the scimitar-toothed cat or scimitar cat, is an extinct genus of machairodontine saber-toothed predator, often termed scimitar-toothed cats, that inhabited North America, South America, Eurasia, and Africa during the Pliocene and Pleistocene epochs (4 mya – 12,000 years ago), existing for approximately .

It became extinct in Africa some 1.5 million years ago. The most recent Eurasian remains, recovered from what is now the North Sea, have been dated to around 28,000 years BP. In South America it is only known from a few remains in the northern region (Venezuela), from the mid-Pleistocene.

Taxonomy and distribution

The lineage of Homotherium is estimated (based on mitochondrial DNA sequences) to have diverged from that of Smilodon about 18 million years ago. Homotherium probably derived from Machairodus and appeared for the first time at the Miocene–Pliocene border, about 4 to 5 million years ago. During the Pleistocene it occurred in vast parts of Eurasia, North America and until the middle Pleistocene (about 1.5 million years ago) even in Africa. A fossil of H. crenatidens was inadvertently dredged from the bed of the North Sea, which was a flat, low-lying extent of marshy tundra laced with rivers during the last glacial period. It was thought that H. latidens had gone extinct relatively early, nearly 300,000 years ago, but a rogue specimen of H. latidens was found in the North Sea of Europe, dated to be from 28,000 years ago. There has also been a discovery of 1.8-million-year-old fossils in Venezuela, indicating that scimitar-toothed cats were able to invade South America along with Smilodon during the Great American Interchange. These remains form the holotype of Homotherium venezuelensis. How long they lasted in South America is not yet evident. Homotherium survived in Eurasia until about 28,000 years ago.

Several Eurasian species have been recognized based mainly on differences in the size and shape of the upper canines and body size: H. latidens, H. nestianus, H. sainzelli, H. crenatidens, H. nihowanensis, and H. ultimum. However, given the range of sizes found in extant large cats, it is likely that they represent a single species, Homotherium latidens.

Two species described from early Pleistocene Africa, H. ethiopicum and H. hadarensis—also hardly differ from the Eurasian forms. On the African continent the genus disappeared about 1.5 million years ago. In North America a very similar species, H. serum, occurred from the late Pliocene until the late Pleistocene. However, both morphological and genetic data suggest that all late Pleistocene Homotherium individuals worldwide should probably be regarded as members of H. latidens. Remains have been found at various sites between Alaska and Texas. In the southern parts of its range the American Homotherium co-existed with Smilodon; in the northern parts it was the only species of saber-toothed cat. The American Homotherium was originally described by the name Dinobastis.

Despite Homotheriums vast range and the large quantity of fossil remains from Eurasia, Africa and North America, complete skeletons of this cat are relatively rare. One of the most famous sites of Homotherium remains is Friesenhahn cave in Texas, where 30 Homotherium skeletons were found, along with hundreds of juvenile mammoths and several dire wolves.

The genus Dinobastis was originally named by Cope (1893). Its type is Dinobastis serus. It was synonymized subjectively with Smilodon by Matthew (1910) and later with Homotherium by Churcher (1966), Schultz et al.

Description

Homotherium reached  at the shoulder and weighed an estimated  and was therefore about the size of a male lion. Compared to more familiar machairodonts, like Smilodon or Megantereon, Homotherium had comparatively shorter upper canines, but these flat, serrated teeth were still longer than those of any living cat. Homotherium'''s incisors and lower canines formed a powerful puncturing and gripping device. The skull was longer than in Smilodon, and it possessed a well-developed sagittal crest, where muscles were attached to power the lower jaw. The lower jaw had downwards-flared flanges to protect the upper canines. Its large canine teeth were crenulated and designed for slashing rather than purely stabbing. However, a 2018 study by Figueirido and colleagues found that Homotherium possessed a bite adapted to clamp and hold while inflicting damage with its canines, similar to a lion's, due to the larger amounts of trabecular bone present in the skulls of the genus. This is unlike the canine shear-bite of Smilodon, which it has been compared to, and this difference in killing bites provides evidence for distinct ecological adaptations.

The large upper canines of Homotherium were likely hidden by the upper lips and gum tissues of the lower lips jaw similar to extant cats, unlike the larger upper canines of Smilodon. 

 
The unusually large, square nasal opening, similar to that of the cheetah (Acinonyx jubatus), may have allowed faster oxygen intake, which would have facilitated strenuous cursorial activity and cooling of the brain following such behaviour. The visual cortex in Homotherium's brain was large and complex, also alike that of the modern cheetah, implying that it relied heavily on vision during the hunt.

Diet and habitats

The decline of Homotherium could be a result of the disappearance of large herbivorous mammals like mammoths in America at the end of the Pleistocene. In North America fossil remains of Homotherium are less abundant than those of its contemporary Smilodon. For the most part it probably inhabited higher latitudes and altitudes and therefore was likely to be well adapted to the colder conditions of the mammoth steppe environment. The reduced claws, relatively slender limbs, and sloping back all appear to be adaptations for endurance running in open habitats.

Genomic analysis supports the hypothesis that Homotherium was social and well-adapted to life as a pursuit predator. Genes revealing high genetic diversity indicate the genus was far more common than previously assumed due to the preservation bias of the fossil record. The study also revealed that this genus of machairodont was most likely diurnal, and would have mainly hunted in daylight.

African Homotherium species seem to have hunted early Pleistocene species of Deinotherium, likely preferring to target the more vulnerable adolescents or calves in a herd. Due to their saber-teeth, an attack on such thick-skinned prey would have likely been significantly easier and less time-consuming compared to a similar hunt on modern elephants by lions.

At the well known Friesenhahn Cave site in Texas, the remains of almost 400 juvenile mammoths were discovered along with numerous Homotherium skeletons of all ages, from elderly specimens to cubs. Based on this fossil site, Homotherium was likely a social predator that would have been specialized in hunting young mammoths and that subsequently dragged the kills into secluded caves to eat in relative peace. Homotherium also seemed to have retained the excellent nocturnal vision typical of most cats, and hunting at night in the arctic regions where many Homotherium have been found would have been a prime hunting method. The sloped back and powerful lumbar section of Homotheriums vertebrae suggest a bear-like build, and thus that these animals could have been capable of pulling formidable loads; further, broken upper canines - a common injury in fossils of other machairodonts such as Machairodus and Smilodon that would have resulted from struggling with their prey - is not seen in Homotherium, perhaps because their social groups would completely restrain prey items before any of the cats attempted to kill the target with their saber teeth. Moreover, the bones of the young mammoths found in Friesenhahn Cave show distinctive marks matching the incisors of Homotherium, indicating that they could efficiently process most of the meat on a carcass and that the mammoths had been deposited in the caves by the cats themselves and not by scavengers. Examination of the bones also indicates that the carcasses of these juvenile mammoths were dismembered after being killed by the cats before being dragged away, suggesting that Homotherium'' would disarticulate their kill to transport it to a safe area such as a hidden lair or den and prevent competitors such as dire wolves and American lions from usurping the carcass.

See also

References

External links 

 The saber-toothed cat of the North Sea, 2008, accessed 10/28/2019 
 American Scimitar Cat
 Saber-toothed cat jaw
 South America gets two more sabercats

Homotherini
Pliocene carnivorans
Pleistocene carnivorans
Pleistocene extinctions
Cenozoic mammals of Africa
Cenozoic mammals of Asia
Cenozoic mammals of Europe
Cenozoic mammals of North America
Holarctic fauna
Prehistoric carnivoran genera
Zanclean first appearances
Fossil taxa described in 1890
Pleistocene mammals of North America
Pleistocene mammals of Africa
Saber-toothed cats